Pablo Osvaldo Vázquez (born 1 January 1984 in Rosario) is an Argentinian retired football striker.

Club career
Vázquez began his career in his native Rosario playing for lower division team Argentino. In 2004, he relocated to Peru to play for Coronel Bolognesi. The following year he returned to Argentina to and join Club Atlético Estudiantes from Buenos Aires, then he played for Central Córdoba and later he did for Villa Mitre. In 2007, he finally played in the Argentine first division with his hometown club Newell's. After a year with the leprosos, he transferred to Nueva Chicago where he played until the end of the 2008 calendar.

In 2009, he emigrated to Bolivia and joined The Strongest by request of team manager and fellow countryman Julio César Toresani.

Poli Timişoara
The goalscorer of Liga de Fútbol Profesional Boliviano signed a 1-year loan agreement with FC Timişoara.
He didn't adapt to the life in Romania and returned to his Club Strongest.

References

External links
 Argentine Primera statistics at Fútbol XXI  
 Futbol Mercado 
 

1984 births
Living people
Footballers from Rosario, Santa Fe
Argentine footballers
Argentine expatriate footballers
Association football forwards
Coronel Bolognesi footballers
Estudiantes de Buenos Aires footballers
Newell's Old Boys footballers
Nueva Chicago footballers
Central Córdoba de Rosario footballers
The Strongest players
Club Real Potosí players
C.D. Cuenca footballers
C.D. Olimpia players
Chilean Primera División players
Argentine Primera División players
Expatriate footballers in Chile
Argentine expatriate sportspeople in Chile
Expatriate footballers in Peru
Argentine expatriate sportspeople in Peru
Expatriate footballers in Bolivia
Argentine expatriate sportspeople in Bolivia
Expatriate footballers in Honduras
Argentino de Rosario footballers
Argentine expatriate sportspeople in Honduras